Jeevante Jeevan is a 1985 Indian Malayalam-language film written and directed by J. Williams. The film stars Mohanlal, Maniyanpilla Raju, Prathapachandran and Arathi Gupta in the lead roles. The film has musical score by Shyam.

Cast

Mohanlal as Jayan, a widower
Shalini Kumar as Biju (Jayan's son)
Arathi Gupta
Sharat Saxena as a boxer
Balan K. Nair as Pathmanabhan Thambi
Kuthiravattam Pappu as Peter (Jayan's friend)
Maniyanpilla Raju as Prakash
T. G. Ravi as Police officer
C. I. Paul as Master
Prathapachandran
Pattom Sadhan
Bob Christo as Boxer Bob Christo
Manik Irani as Chandran
Rani Padmini as Stella
Lalithasree as Mummy
Silk Smitha
Anuradha as Item dancer

Soundtrack
The music was composed by Shyam and the lyrics were written by Poovachal Khader.

References

External links 
 

1985 films
1980s Malayalam-language films